A fruticose lichen is a form of lichen fungi that is characterized by a coral-like shrubby or bushy growth structure. It is formed from a symbiotic relationship of a photobiont such as green algae or less commonly cyanobacteria and one, two or more mycobionts.  Fruticose lichens are not a monophyletic and holophyletic lineage, but is a form encountered in many classes.  Fruticose lichens have a complex vegetation structure, and are characterized by an ascending, bushy or pendulous appearance. As with other lichens, many fruticose lichens can endure high degrees of desiccation. They grow slowly and often occur in habitats such as on tree barks, on rock surfaces and on soils in the Arctic and mountain regions.

Characteristics
Fruticose lichens are lichens composed of a shrubby or bushy thallus and a holdfast. The thallus is the vegetative body of a lichen that does not have true leaves, stems, or roots. The thallus colour is affected by the algae in the lichen, compounds created by the lichen, the character of the fungal hyphae, and the amounts of light and water in its environment. A light thallus color is associated with lower light conditions within the growing environment.  

Lichens may survive extreme desiccation by an ability to quench excess light energy. Characteristic of fruticose lichen is the shape of the thallus. Like crustose lichen, fruticose lichen is composed of a holdfast which will act as an anchor for the lichen to grow in rock fissures, over loose sand or soil.

Growth and structure

Fruticose or ‘shrubby’ lichens differ from other forms of lichen because their bushy form is attached to the substrate only at the base of the lichen. A continuous algal layer grows around the circumference of the branches of the lichen. Many fruticose lichens have fine, round, hair-like structures and are loosely attached to rocks and trees. Although fruticose lichens are defined as being bushy, some can exhibit a flattened and strap-like appearances. Highly branched fruticose lichen have a high surface to volume ratio that results in a rapid drying and wetting pattern compared to lichens that have a lower surface to volume ratio.

The internal structure of a fruticose lichen branch has a dense outer cortex, a thin algal layer, a medulla and a hollow center or a dense central cord. The structure of fruticose lichens depends also on their mycobionts. Lichen undergoes diffuse growth and the thallus elongates over time. New branch cells grow through the wall materials of older neighboring cells. Microenvironmental conditions influence individual thalli and branches, causing non-uniform growth. There may be many stages of growth for fruticose lichen from the beginning to end of their life cycle.

Reproduction and dispersal
Lichens reproduce vegetatively or possibly by fungal spores that would need to form new associations with other partners.  There are three common spore-bearing structures found in lichens: the apothecium, the perithecium and the pycnidium. The apothecium is described as being either sessile or immersed. The thallus is known as sessile if it sits atop the surface of its growth medium. If the apothecium is level with or sits below the surface, it is known as immersed. The second form of spore-bearing structure is a perithecium which refers to the complete immersion in the substratum of rock or bark. Finally, the pycnidium, commonly seen on the surface of foliose lichen lichen and crustose lichen, are absent in fruticose lichens. Reproduction based on fungal spores has not been well documented, and the significance of this mode is not known.

Diversity

There are many different varieties of fruticose lichen. They are encountered in the following classes: Arthoniales, Licinales, Baeomycetales, Candelariales, Lecanorales, Peltigerales, Pertusariales, Teloschistales, and Mycocaliciales, among others. Each type of fruticose lichen will differ in structure, and some types will be more dominant in a particular environment compared to other forms of fruticose lichen.
 Pseudephebe minuscula has a fruticose thallus consisting of thin branches that result in the formation of dense mats.
 Pseudephebe pubescens has thin branches that are loosely entangled.
 Usnea has stringy strands that may be short, tufted and bush-like, and may reach a length of several meters. This form of lichen has a characteristic, tough central core. This gives a mild degree of support to the lichen while also providing storage for a large proportion of the water contained in this form, called fruticose lichen.

Distribution and accumulation
Fruticose growth forms can be found world-wide in wet humid climates, in temperate rainforests, or in arid conditions. Fruticose lichens are most commonly distributed in mountains, forests and arctic tundra. The accumulation rate of lichen varies within different environments. Lichen biomass accumulation rates decrease from mountain to alpine belts and from tree top to base. This is because lichens near tree tops are in their early life stages when growth rates are higher. Lower lichen accumulation of the alpine belt may be explained by harsh climate.

Economic and ecological significance
Although they lack economic importance comparable to that of their algal and fungal components, some lichens play an important role in nitrogen cycling, providing critical winter forage for caribou and colonizing newly exposed surfaces.

References 

Lichenology